The Last is the fifth and final studio album by the Bachata group Aventura, released on June 9, 2009. In the "Intro" of this album, Anthony "Romeo" Santos states that this could possibly be their last album; his prediction came true in July 2011 when the group publicly confirmed it was breaking up for good.

The Last became the top selling Latin album of 2009 and 2010. The Last spent 23 weeks at number one in the Latin Billboard chart. The Last debuted at number 5 in the Billboard chart and number 1 in the Latin Billboard chart.

Album information
One of the members of the group, the guitarist Lenny told MTV that the album was recorded in Wyclef's studio, and stated that Wyclef wanted to record a song with them. The song was "Spanish Fly", which features Wyclef Jean and Ludacris.

Rumors were circulating that this album would be the last of the group. In the "Intro" of this album, Anthony Santos states that this could possibly be their last album. However, the group said that this is their last album with their label Premium Latin Music. So there will still be Aventura albums to come in the near future, but however in 2011, that was rebuked after Santos announced that the group is breaking up for good.

Aside from their original Bachata sound, the album also explores new genres for the group. In the song "All Up 2 You", has a Europop dance sound with auto-tune effects. Also the songs "Spanish Fly" has a dance-pop sound. The New York Times called "The  Last", Aventura's surest, catchiest record. The group collaborated with reggaeton duo Wisin & Yandel, Akon, Wyclef Jean, and Ludacris.

The album has become thus far the group's best album. The album spawned four hit singles, two which topped the Latin charts, and has been the #1 album for 23 weeks on Billboard Top Latin Albums. At the Premio Lo Nuestro 2010 awards, the album was awarded "Tropical Album of the Year". At the Billboard Latin Music Awards of 2010 in held in San Juan, Puerto Rico Aventura won nine awards including one for Album of the Year for "The Last"

Singles
"Por un Segundo" is the first single release from the album, released in January 2009 along with its music video. "Por un Segundo" became the group's first number one on the Billboard Top Latin Tracks chart.

"All Up 2 You" was released as the second single. The song features R&B artist Akon, and reggaeton duo Wisin & Yandel and a remix with dancehall artist Adrian Banton. the song reached top five on the charts, peaking at number four.

"Su Veneno" was released as the third single in July 2009. The song was released as a bolero version and a bachata version the following day. The song became another top five hit peaking at number four in the Hot Latin Tracks.

"Dile al Amor" was released as the fourth single in late 2009 and became the group's second number one single on the Hot Latin Tracks.

"El Malo" was released as the fifth single in early 2010. Initially, the song did not reach same success as the previous singles on the Hot Latin Tracks until it was re-released. The single became another top five hit, peaking at number five on Hot Latin Tracks and number one on the Tropical Airplay charts.

"El Desprecio" was released as the promo single and only peaked number forty on the Tropical Airplay charts, it was also featured on the soundtrack for Grand Theft Auto: The Ballad of Gay Tony.

Chart performance
The Last debuted at number five in the U.S. Billboard 200 with sales of 37,000 units, the act's best sales week ever. The album also arrived at number-one on the Top Latin Albums chart, where it became their first chart-topper and holding the number one position for 16 non-consecutive weeks on the top Latin charts and becoming the best selling Latin album of 2009 with 246,000 copies sold. The group had charted three previous top five sets there. The  album has sold more than 400,000 copies on USA.

Critical reception

John Bush of Allmusic gave the album a somewhat positive review. He called the lead single "Por un Segundo" a "straight bachata, rhythmic and sweet" and noted that the crossovers are put on the latter half of the album. Tijana Ilich of About.com praised the vocals of Anthony "Romeo" Santos and the called song "Soy Hombre" the best on the album. On the other hand, she criticized the lack of diversity on the album as "Basically all-bachata album".

Track listing

Producers
The album was produced mostly by Anthony "Romeo" Santos, Lenny Santos, and Gerry Grimaud, Jr. Other artist and producers were involve in producing the following tracks: 

Jerry Duplessis, Wyclef Jean, and Logic  – Spanish Fly
Tainy, Victor "El Nasi", and Marioso  – All Up 2 You
Angel Fernandez  – La Curita
Henry Santos Jeter  – Princesita

Charts

Weekly charts

Year-end charts

Sales and certifications

Release history

See also
 List of number-one Billboard Top Latin Albums of 2009
 List of number-one Billboard Latin Albums from the 2010s
List of number-one Billboard Tropical Albums from the 2000s
List of number-one Billboard Tropical Albums from the 2010s

References

External links
Aventura official site
Bachata band Aventura wins big at Latin Billboard awards - Nydailynews

2009 albums
Aventura (band) albums